The Cork Socialist Party was a minor political party based in Cork, Ireland. It was founded in 1945, 
and was formed in the aftermath of the Irish Labour Party expelling the members and disbanding the Cork Liam Mellows Branch of the Party which had only been formed in 1944.
Spanish Civil War veteran Michael O'Riordan was the secretary other notable members included Jim Savage and Gerry Higgins (who like O'Riordan had been a member of the Liam Mellows branch of the Irish Labour Party), other notable members were Derry Kelleher, Kevin Neville and Máire Keohane-Sheehan.

The Cork Socialist Party ran a number of public lectures on topics like 'science and socialism', 'on the Jewish question', 'Cork Pioneers of Socialism (William Thompson)'.

In 1945 the party ran Micheal O'Riordan for a seat on Cork Corporation, he was narrowly defeated being eliminated on the last count. O'Riordan also ran in the 1946 by-election in Cork Borough receiving 3,184 votes. O'Riordan went on to join the Irish Workers Party and eventually become general secretary of Communist Party of Ireland when it was formed.

References

Defunct political parties in the Republic of Ireland
Political parties established in 1945
Communist parties in Ireland
1945 establishments in Ireland
1946 disestablishments in Ireland
Political parties disestablished in 1946